Atlanta Rhythm Section '96 is an album by the American Southern rock band Atlanta Rhythm Section, released in 1996. The album is a re-recording of ARS songs, featuring original members Ronnie Hammond, Barry Bailey, and Dean Daughtry. The album features different take on the classic songs including more guitar heavy "So Into You" and "Spooky".

CMC International (1996) original track listing 
"So into You" (Buie, Daughtry, Nix) – 6:42
"Champagne Jam" (Buie, Cobb, Nix) – 4:43
"Jukin' " (Buie, Nix) – 3:32
"Imaginary Lover" (Buie, Daughtry, Nix) – 5:05
"Spooky" (Buie, Cobb, Middlebrooks) – 4:55
"Doraville" (Bailey, Buie, Nix) – 3:35
"Georgia Rhythm" (Buie, Cobb, Nix) – 5:29
"Free Spirit" (Buie, Hammond, Nix) – 3:58
"I'm Not Gonna Let It Bother Me Tonight" (Buie, Daughtry, Nix) – 4:31
"Do It or Die" (Buie, Cobb, Hammond) – 3:18
"Dog Days" (Buie, Daughtry, Nix) – 3:35
"Homesick" (Buie, Cobb) - 4:58

Cleopatra/Purple Pyramid (2001) reissue track listing 
"So into You"
"Jukin' "
"I'm Not Gonna Let It Bother Me Tonight"
"Do It or Die"
"Homesick"
"Imaginary Lover"
"Spooky"
"Doraville"
"Georgia Rhythm"
"Free Spirit"
"Dog Days"
"Champagne Jam"

Personnel 
Ronnie Hammond - vocals
Barry Bailey - lead guitar
Dean Daughtry - keyboards
Steve Stone - second guitar
Justin Senker - bass guitar
Sean Burke - drums

Production 
Producer: Buddy Buie
Engineer: Rodney Mills
Assistant engineer: Benny Dellinger

References

Atlanta Rhythm Section albums
1996 albums
Albums produced by Buddy Buie